The 1960–61 Scottish Inter-District Championship was a rugby union competition for Scotland's district teams.

This season saw the eighth formal Scottish Inter-District Championship.

Edinburgh District won the competition with three wins.

1960-61 League Table

Results

Round 1

Glasgow District: 

South:

Round 2

South:

North and Midlands:

Round 3

 Edinburgh District: 

North and Midlands:

Round 4

Glasgow District: 

Edinburgh District:

Round 5

Edinburgh District: 

South:

Round 6

North and Midlands: J. C. Craig (Harris Academy FP) [captain], D. J. Whyte (St. Andrews University), I. R. McDonald (Aberdeen GSFP),J. Coletta (Gordonians), A. Bryce (Dunfermline), W. M. Johnston (Dunfermline), L. G. McCrae (Gordonians), G. P. Hill (Gordonians),A. G. D. Whyte (Gordonians), A. Fraser (Perthshire Academicals), M. G. H. Gibb (Aberdeen GSFP), J. Steven (Madras College FP),R. Steven (Howe of Fife), R. J. C. Glasgow (Dunfermline)

Glasgow District: M. R. McKechnie (Greenock Wanderers), C. G. Hodgson (Glasgow HSFP), D. A. C. Montgomery (Glasgow Academicals),D. D. M. McGavin (Kelvinside Academicals), P. M. Connolly (Jordanhill College), J. T. Docherty (Glasgow HSFP), I. D. Beattie (Jordanhill College),I. G. C. McLaren (Glasgow HSFP), I. Williamson (Glasgow HSFP), C. Allan (Jordanhill College), Hamish Kemp (Glasgow HSFP),D. E. Mitchell (Greenock Wanderers), I. Cosgrove (Jordanhill College), P. H. Milne (Kelvinside Academicals), R. D. Andrews (Glasgow HSFP)

References

1960–61 in Scottish rugby union
Scottish Inter-District Championship seasons